Pharsalus is the type genus of planthoppers in the subfamily Pharsalinae (family Ricaniidae), containing the single species Pharsalus repandus; it was described by Leopold Melichar in 1906.

References

External links
 

Ricaniidae
Monotypic Hemiptera genera